William Richard Titterton (1876–1963) was a British journalist, writer and poet now remembered as the friend and first biographer of G. K. Chesterton. Titterton and Chesterton met on the London Daily News.

Early life

In his younger days, he wrote copiously for A. R. Orage's The New Age. He was the model for some of Jacob Epstein's nude sculptures; he modelled too for George Grey Barnard, for the Harrisburg, Pennsylvania courthouse.

The Weekly and the League

Titterton was in practical terms the organiser of Chesterton's Distributist League, and sub-editor of G. K.'s Weekly.

There were financial problems, and embarrassment caused by Titterton's commissioning of articles on H. G. Wells by the lesser writer Edwin Pugh; Pugh's articles had a hostile edge and Chesterton had to pacify Wells. His position on the Weekly came to an end in 1928, when he was replaced by Edward Macdonald, in a temporarily acrimonious situation, leading to the separation of the Weekly and the League.

Under Chesterton's influence, he became a Catholic convert in 1931.

Works

River Music and other poems (1900)
Love Poems (New Age Press, c 1908)
An Afternoon Tea Philosophy (1910)
The Drifters (1910)
Me As A Model (1914)
London Scenes (1918)
Guns and Guitars (1918) poems
Drinking Songs and other songs (1928)
A Candle to the Stars (1932) interviews
G. K. Chesterton: A Portrait (1936) biography, Online text (PDF)
Poems for the Forces (1943)
London Pride (1944)
So this is Shaw (1945) biography
Poems: A Backward Glance (1959)

Notes

British biographers
British male journalists
British poets
Converts to Roman Catholicism
1876 births
1963 deaths
British male poets
Male biographers